Norwegian recording artist Sissel Kyrkjebø, known internationally as Sissel, has recorded songs for twelve studio albums and has collaborated with other recording artists for vocal duets and featured songs on their respective albums. Sissel is considered one of the world's top crossover sopranos and her combined solo record sales (not including soundtracks and other albums to which she contributed) amount to 10 million albums sold, most of them in Norway, a country with 5 million people. Her albums have also sold well in Scandinavia, the US and Japan. Together with Odd Nordstoga, they are the only Norwegian artists to have an album go 11 times platinum in album sales for Strålande jul (Glorious Christmas) in 2009.

Sissel's musical style runs the gamut from pop recordings and traditional folk songs, to classical vocals and operatic arias. She possesses a "crystalline" voice and wide vocal range, sweeping down from mezzo-soprano notes, in arias such as Mon cœur s'ouvre à ta voix from Saint-Saëns's opera Samson et Dalila, to the F natural above soprano C.

Sissel has sung duets with singers like Plácido Domingo, José Carreras, Andrea Bocelli, Bryn Terfel, Josh Groban, Neil Sedaka, Mario Frangoulis, Russell Watson, Brian May, Tommy Körberg, Diana Krall, Warren G, Charles Aznavour, Dee Dee Bridgewater and The Chieftains. She sings mainly in English and Norwegian, and has also sung songs in Swedish, Danish, Irish, Italian, French, Russian, Icelandic, Faroese, German, Neapolitan, Maori, Japanese, and Latin.

Her participation on the Titanic film soundtracks, singing the Olympic Hymn (Hymne Olympique) at the opening and closing ceremonies of the 1994 Winter Olympics in Lillehammer, Norway, and the tour with the Lord of the Rings Symphony has made her voice familiar to people all over the world. Sissel received her first U.S. Grammy nominations on 6 December 2007 for a collaboration with the Mormon Tabernacle Choir. Spirit of the Season, a collection of songs from the choir's 2006 Christmas concert featuring Sissel and the Orchestra at Temple Square, was nominated for the Best Classical Crossover Album of the Year, as well as Best Engineered Classical Album.

Released songs by Sissel

Unreleased/rare/unfinished/performed songs

Notes 
Kyrkjebø was scheduled to record the theme song to James Cameron's 1997 blockbuster film Titanic, but Celine Dion's vocals was preferred due to James Horner's decision to support Dion's career. In an interview from December 2014, Horner quotes: "When I had completed the Titanic [movie], I had to decide for Celine Dion or Sissel['s] [vocals]. Sissel I am very close, while Celine I had known since she was 18, and I had already written three film songs for [her]. But that was before Celine was known and filmmakers and marketing people had not done what they should have done for Celine and [her] songs. So I felt I owed her a Titanic chance, but I could [still] have used Sissel there." Instead, Kyrkjebø completed much of the score for the soundtrack album, Titanic: Music from the Motion Picture. Years later, Horner chose Kyrkjebø to perform "My Heart Will Go On" on both world premieres of Titanic 3D (2012) and Titanic Live (2015).

See also 
 Sissel Kyrkjebø
 Sissel Kyrkjebø discography

References

External links 
 Official website

Sissel